Robert (Bob) S. Schwartz, C.Ped., is an American businessman who is the president and CEO of Eneslow Pedorthic Enterprises, Inc. This includes Eneslow, a New York City specialty shoe store and pedorthic facility founded in 1909, and Eneslow Pedorthic Institute (EPI) an education and training center for healthcare professionals. He is a frequent lecturer to healthcare professionals, footwear retailers and the public, and a recognized leader in the footwear and footcare industries. He holds a B.S., accounting, Syracuse University (graduated in 1962), and is a Certified Pedorthist (C. Ped), American Board for Certification in Orthotics, Prosthetics & Pedorthics in 1974

Professional activities
Schwartz is currently an adjunct instructor in the department of orthopedic sciences at the New York College of Podiatric Medicine. He has been a faculty member of the pedorthic programs at   Aetrex University, Northwestern University, New York University, UCLA, Ball State University, and Shoe Service Institute of America. He was on the advisory board of foot.com and Pedorthic Newswire.

He currently serves as vice-chair and on the board of directors of the National Shoe Retailers Association (NSRA), from 1994 to 2010, and [3] chair of its education committee; he has also served as chair of the Pedorthic Educators Committee and is a former president of the Pedorthic Footcare Association the professional association of pedorthists.

Awards
In 1987, Schwartz received the Seymour Lefton Award by the Pedorthic Footwear Association (PFA), its most prestigious honor, for his advancement of the pedorthic profession.

In 2008 he received the Al Singer Award by the National Shoe Retailers Association (NSRA), "in recognition of traits so essential to progress: independence, innovation, perseverance, a quest for challenges, and an unwavering love of humanity."

In 2009 he was named Retailer of the Year by the Manhattan Chamber of Commerce. 

In 2010 Mr. Schwartz was named “Corporate Hero” by the New York Chapter of the Arthritis Foundation for his participation in the “Arthritis Walk” and educating healthcare professionals and the public on the importance of walking to improve health.

In 2012 Schwartz was recognized by Tender Care Human Services “in recognition of support and dedication to Robert Schwartz from The Laura Vitolo Pastina Art Therapy Program and The Heather on Earth Music Therapy Program."

In 2015 Eneslow was awarded the “Age Smart Employer Award”, an initiative of the Robert N. Butler Columbia Aging Center and NY Academy of Medicine created to “honor workplaces that value workers of all ages. It is funded by the Alfred P. Sloan Foundation.

In 2019 Eneslow Shoes & Orthotics earned the Footwear Insight Magazine Gold Medal Service Award! 

In 2020 Eneslow Shoes & Orthotics received the Congressional Record from US Representative Carolyn B. Maloney for celebrating 110 years serving the Community. In 2020 NYC Department of SBS Acknowledged Eneslow as one of ten centennial businesses for 111 years of exceptional service to New York City.  In 2020 Robert Schwartz is named OTTY Honoree 2020 for his Business Built on a Strong Foundation.

He has published many articles on pedorthics and footwear which have appeared in Current Pedorthics, M. Jahss: Foot & Ankle, Podiatry Management, Biomechanics, PM News, Pedorthic Newswire, Healthy Living from the Ground Up, etc.

Civic activities
He currently serves on the board of directors of the Manhattan Chamber of Commerce, representing small and retail businesses. He has served as the President and on the board and executive committee of the  a New York City civic and trade organization, and of 23rd Street Community Projects, a 501(c)3 Foundation.

References

External links
 Eneslow Website

Living people
Year of birth missing (living people)
American chief executives
Businesspeople from New York City
Syracuse University alumni